Dobsonia is a genus of megabat in the family Pteropodidae. It contains the following 13 species:

Genus Dobsonia
 Andersen's naked-backed fruit bat, Dobsonia anderseni
 Beaufort's naked-backed fruit bat, Dobsonia beauforti
 Philippine bare-backed fruit bat, Dobsonia chapmani
 Halmahera naked-backed fruit bat, Dobsonia crenulata
 Biak naked-backed fruit bat, Dobsonia emersa
 Sulawesi naked-backed fruit bat, Dobsonia exoleta
 Solomon's naked-backed fruit bat, Dobsonia inermis
 New Guinea naked-backed fruit bat, Dobsonia magna
 Lesser naked-backed fruit bat, Dobsonia minor
 Moluccan naked-backed fruit bat, Dobsonia moluccensis 
 Panniet naked-backed fruit bat, Dobsonia pannietensis (including subspecies D. pannietensis remota which is sometimes referred to as D. remota)
 Western naked-backed fruit bat, Dobsonia peroni
 New Britain naked-backed fruit bat, Dobsonia praedatrix
 Greenish naked-backed fruit bat, Dobsonia viridis

 
Bat genera
Taxa named by Theodore Sherman Palmer
Taxonomy articles created by Polbot